The men's Greco-Roman 71 kilograms is a competition featured at the 2014 World Wrestling Championships, and was held in Tashkent, Uzbekistan on 14 September 2014.

This Greco-Roman wrestling competition consisted of a single-elimination tournament, with a repechage used to determine the winners of two bronze medals.

Results
Legend
C — Won by 3 cautions given to the opponent
F — Won by fall

Final

Top half

Bottom half

Repechage

References

External links
Official website

Men's Greco-Roman 71 kg